Charles Hotham (1806–1855) was an Australian politician and Governor of Victoria.

Charles Hotham  may also refer to:
Charles Hotham (priest) (1615–1672), English cleric
Charles Frederick Hotham (1843–1925), admiral in the Royal Navy
Sir Charles Hotham, 4th Baronet (c.1663–1723), British Army officer
Sir Charles Hotham, 5th Baronet (1693–1738), envoy from Great Britain
Sir Charles Hotham-Thompson, 8th Baronet (1729–1794) 
Sir Charles Hotham, 10th Baronet (1766–1811) of the Hotham baronets
Charles Hotham, 4th Baron Hotham (1836–1872), Baron Hotham